The Huddersfield Contemporary Music Festival (also known by the acronym HCMF, stylised since 2006 as the lowercase hcmf//) is a new music festival held annually in Huddersfield, West Yorkshire, England. Since its foundation in 1978, it has featured major international figures of experimental and avant garde music, including guest composers such as Karlheinz Stockhausen, Louis Andriessen, Terry Riley, Brian Eno, John Cage, Steve Reich, Jonathan Harvey, Helmut Lachenmann and Sir Harrison Birtwistle. Its programme also includes improvisation, installation, sound sculptures, happenings, new technology and free jazz.

The festival is held across several venues in the town, including the Lawrence Batley Theatre, Huddersfield Town Hall, St Paul's Hall, St Thomas's Church and the Creative Arts Building of the University of Huddersfield.  There is also a Festival Hub which offers refreshments, CDs and free live shows every morning of the festival.

The Huddersfield Contemporary Music Festival archive is held at the University of Huddersfield Archives at Heritage Quay.

History

The festival was founded at the suggestion of Richard Phillips, then music officer of the Yorkshire Arts Association. Richard Steinitz, a composer and lecturer at Huddersfield Polytechnic (later to become the University of Huddersfield), was appointed the festival director. The first concert was held on 13 October 1978.

Steinitz was succeeded as director by Susanna Eastburn in 2001 and guest director Tom Service in 2005. The current director is Graham McKenzie, who was appointed in 2006.

In 2005, the festival was held from 17 to 27 November.

In 2006 the festival took place from 17 to 26 November. On the event list was Kitchen Motors, and Psappha.

The 2008 festival ran from 21 to 30 November. A highlight was the performance of several Frank Zappa pieces by the Ascolta ensemble with guests.

The 2009 festival ran from 20 to 29 November. Jonathan Harvey was composer in residence, and the festival also featured the Arditti Quartet, Nieuw Ensemble, Louis Andriessen and musikFabrik.

The 2010 festival ran from 19 to 28 November. The composer in residence was Rebecca Saunders.

In 2011 Bent Sørensen became composer in residence.

The composer in residence for 2012 was Maja Ratkje.

References

External links 
 Huddersfield Contemporary Music Festival Website

Huddersfield
Music festivals in West Yorkshire
Contemporary classical music festivals
Jazz festivals in the United Kingdom
Electronic music festivals in the United Kingdom
Electroacoustic music festivals
Music festivals established in 1978
1978 establishments in England